Teach For America (TFA) is a nonprofit organization whose stated mission is to "enlist, develop, and mobilize as many as possible of our nation's most promising future leaders to grow and strengthen the movement for educational equity and excellence".

The organization aims to accomplish this by recruiting and selecting college graduates from top universities around the United States to serve as teachers. The selected members, known as "corps members," commit to teaching for at least two years in a public or public charter K–12 school in one of the 52 low-income communities that the organization serves.

History

TFA was founded by Wendy Kopp based on her 1989 Princeton University undergraduate thesis. Members of the founding team include value investor Whitney Tilson; former U.S. Commissioner of the Internal Revenue Service, Douglas Shulman; and President and CEO of Knowledge Is Power Program (KIPP), Richard Barth.

Since the first corps was established in 1990, more than 42,000 corps members have completed their commitment to Teach For America. In September 2015, the organization reached a milestone of 50,000 corps members and alumni, who have collectively taught more than 5 million students across the nation.

The first 10 years of the organization are chronicled in Kopp's book "One Day, All Children: The Unlikely Triumph of Teach For America and What I Learned Along the Way" 

In January 2011, Wendy Kopp released her second book, "A Chance To Make History", which outlines what she has learned over the last 20 years working in American education.

Approach 

Teach For America recruits recent college graduates and professionals to teach for two years in urban and rural communities throughout the United States. The goal of Teach For America is for its corps members to make both a short-term and long-term impact by leading their students to reach their full potential and becoming lifelong leaders for educational equity. Corps members do not have to be certified teachers, although certified teachers may apply. Uncertified corps members receive alternative certification through coursework taken while completing the program.

All corps members are required to attend an intensive summer training program to prepare for their commitment. Details vary by region, but typically include a five-day regional introduction, a five to seven week residential institute, including teaching summer school, and one to two weeks of regional orientation.

Teach For America teachers are placed in public schools in urban areas such as New York City, Chicago, Detroit, New Orleans, and Houston, as well as in rural places such as eastern North Carolina and the Mississippi Delta. They then serve for two years and are usually placed in schools with other Teach For America corps members.

Teach For America teachers are full-fledged faculty members at their schools, receiving the normal school district salary and benefits as well as a modest AmeriCorps "education voucher" (which can be used to pay for credentialing courses, cover previous student loans or fund further education during or after the two-year commitment). They do not automatically join a union, but are not prohibited from doing so. They may join union strikes even if they are not union members, at the cost of losing pay.

Retention 
In 2015, Teach For America reported that 88% of its first-year teachers had returned for a second year. The organization also reported that more than 11,000 of its more than 37,000 alumni at the time were still teaching and that further, 65% of its alumni were working full-time in the field of education.

Additionally, the organization reported that 84% of its alumni were working full-time in roles impacting education or low-income communities. This includes more than 900 school leaders, more than 100 elected union leaders, and 250 school system leaders.

Geographical reach 
Teach For America's geographical impact has grown significantly since its foundation. Originally serving only six regions, Teach For America was active in 52 regions as of the 2015–16 school year.

The 52 regions are: Alabama, Appalachia, Arkansas, Baltimore, the Bay Area, Buffalo, Capital Valley (the Sacramento area), Charlotte, Chicago-Northwest Indiana, Colorado, Connecticut, Dallas-Ft. Worth, the D.C. Region, Delaware, Detroit, Eastern North Carolina, the Greater Nashville area, the Greater New Orleans-Louisiana Delta area, the Greater Philadelphia area, Hawai'i, Houston, Idaho, Indianapolis, Jacksonville, Kansas City, the Las Vegas Valley, Los Angeles, Massachusetts, Memphis, the Metro Atlanta area, the Miami-Dade area, Milwaukee, Mississippi, New Jersey, New Mexico, New York City, the North Carolina Piedmont Triad area, Northeast Ohio (the Cleveland area), Oklahoma, Orlando, Phoenix, Rhode Island, the Rio Grande Valley, San Antonio, San Diego, South Carolina, South Dakota, South Louisiana, Southwest Ohio (the Cincinnati area), St. Louis, the Twin Cities, and Washington state.

For the 2016 application season, five regions were classified as "High Priority Regions," or regions with an urgent need for corps members. The five regions are: the Las Vegas Valley, Oklahoma, Mississippi, Eastern North Carolina, and Northeast Ohio (the Cleveland area).

Evaluation

Since the founding of the organization, several independent studies have been conducted to gauge the effectiveness of Teach For America corps members relative to teachers who entered the teaching profession via other channels.

A 2015 Mathematica Policy Research study found that Teach For America teachers produce 1.3 months of extra reading gains in pre-K through second grade classrooms when compared to non-TFA teachers in the same elementary schools. The same study also found that Teach For America teachers across 10 states are as effective as other teachers in math and reading.

A study by the Calder Center and the American Institutes for Research found that Teach For America teachers provide students in Miami with the equivalent of three additional months of math instruction, based on analyzes of test scores from state-mandated tests.

The Harvard Strategic Data Project found in 2012 that Teach For America teachers in the Los Angeles Unified School District produce 1-2 extra months of English and math learning outcomes relative to the gains produced by other novice teachers.

Studies in North Carolina and Tennessee suggest that Teach For America is the most effective source of new teachers in the two states, based on student achievement across subjects and grade levels.

In a study by the Urban Institute and the Calder Center in March 2008, published in the Journal of Public Policy and Management, the authors found "TFA teachers tend to have a positive effect on high school student test scores relative to non-TFA teachers, including those who are certified in-field. Such effects exceed the impact of additional years of experience and are particularly strong in math and science."

Another study by Mathematica in 2013 found that students of Teach For America teachers in eight states learn 2.6 more months of secondary math compared with students taught by non-TFA teachers.

A study conducted by Georgia's Department of Audits and Accounts in 2015 found that about 85 percent of the students taught by Teach For America beginning teachers met or exceeded the state's standards compared to 70-74 percent of those in the classes of traditional certified, rookie teachers. Only 77 percent of veteran teachers saw the same achievement in their students. The study countered the long-held belief that the organization's five-week training led to poor student outcomes.

According to an independent study by Policy Studies Associates in 2011, almost 90% of principals who work with Teach For America teachers reported high levels of satisfaction with Teach For America and noted that corps members are rated as effective as, and in some cases more effective than, veteran faculty in their schools. Additionally, 87% of principals said Teach For America corps members’ training is at least as effective as the training of other beginning teachers, and 53% found corps members’ training to be more effective.

Teach For America won the largest grant of nearly 1,700 applications to the U.S. Department of Education's Investing in Innovation (i3) grant competition in 2010. The 13 scale-up grants required applicants to provide demonstrated evidence of success through objective, methodologically sound studies (e.g., experimental and quasi-experimental research designs) of student achievement.

A 2018 study in the American Political Science Review found that advantaged individuals who teach as part of TFA "adopt beliefs that are closer to those of disadvantaged Americans" as a result of their TFA participation.

Criticism
Teach For America has been criticized by opponents who claim the program replaces experienced teachers with brand-new employees who have had only five weeks of training during the summer, and whom are brought in at beginners' salary levels. This criticism applies to the vast majority of new Teach For America teachers, though a small percentage may have some previous experience in education or advanced degrees. Teach for America has responded to critics of its training program by introducing a new program that encourages juniors at undergraduate universities to complete education courses in their senior year before setting foot in the classroom.

Teachers' unions regularly critique the organization, which they see as undermining the professionalization of the education sector by bringing in temporary amateurs to fill positions traditionally reserved for certified professionals. John Wilson, executive director of the National Education Association, sent a memo in May 2009 stating that union leaders were "beginning to see school systems lay off teachers and then hire Teach For America college grads due to a contract they signed."  Wilson went on to say that Teach For America brings in "the least-prepared and the least-experienced teachers" into low-income schools and makes them "the teacher of record".

USA Today reported that in March 2009, Peter Gorman, the superintendent of Charlotte-Mecklenburg, North Carolina schools told board members that because of a commitment made to the program, 100 Teach For America teachers would be retained in spite of the fact that hundreds of other non-Teach For America teachers in the district would be laid off. However, Teach For America spokeswoman Kerci Marcello Stroud says it would be a mistaken notion to say that Teach For America corps members are displacing experienced teachers. "In every region where we send teachers, we're just one source," she says. "Once they land, corps members must interview for jobs just like everyone else."

Critics of Teach For America have also cited the results of Mathematica Policy Research's 2004 study as an indication of Teach For America's lack of efficacy (see Educational Impact).  These critics claim that while the study shows that students taught by Teach For America teachers perform better in mathematics than those taught by non-Teach For America teachers, the improvement is very small, and that furthermore there is no difference in reading performance between the two groups.

A 2010 article published by Campus Progress suggested that "TFA’s breakneck training course leaves TFA teachers—or 'corps members,' as they’re called—with insufficient classroom experience, before throwing them headfirst into some of the most disadvantaged school districts in the country."

Deborah Appleman, a professor of Educational Studies at Carleton College, wrote in a 2009 editorial for the Minneapolis Star-Tribune that "[i]mplicit in Teach for America's approach is the insidious assumption that anyone who knows a subject and is willing to be with kids can teach – with little training." She also challenged TFA's "elitist" structure. "The story of TFA becomes a kind of master narrative, a story of heroic and altruistic young people that focuses much more squarely on them than it does on the lives of the children they are committed to serve. There is an elitist overtone to the structure of TFA, a belief that the best and the brightest can make a difference in the lives of children who are less fortunate, even when they are not professionally prepared to do so."

Kopp said in a Seattle radio appearance in 2001 that outsiders often misunderstand the function of TFA. “We’re a leadership development organization, not a teaching organization,” she said. “I think if you don’t understand that, of course it’s easy to tear the whole thing apart.”  Critics claim this comment shows TFA exists more to advance the career of its recruits than of the students it claims to help.

Teach For America Counter-Narratives: Alumni Speak Up and Speak Out (Peter Lang, 2015), edited by T. Jameson Brewer and Kathleen deMarrais, was the first official collection of critical alumni voices. Each chapter of the book, written by TFA alumni, sheds light on the organization. With critical narratives covering the entire span of TFA's 25 years of operations, the chapters are organized into three broad categories: (1) TFA's Recruitment, Training, and Support Structure; (2) TFA's Approach to Diversity; and (3) TFA's Approach to Criticism and Critics.

In February 2019, over 300 TFA Alumni signed a letter objecting to the organization putting pressure on young teachers to cross the picket line during the Oakland teachers' strike. Because TFA corps members are often AmeriCorps members, and striking is a prohibited activity for AmeriCorps members, TFA educators risked losing their AmeriCorps award if they went on strike.

Alumni 
Notable Teach For America alumni include:
 Gregg Costa (Mississippi Delta '94), United States Circuit Judge for the United States Court of Appeals for the Fifth Circuit
 Mike Feinberg (Houston '92), KIPP Co-founder
 Bill Ferguson (Baltimore '05), Maryland state senator
 Smokey Fontaine (Baltimore '93), An American writer, music critic and editor
 James Foley (Phoenix '96), Photojournalist murdered while a prisoner of Isis in Syria in 2014
 Nicholas Gilson (Nashville '11), Founder and CEO of Gilson Snow
 Peter Hermann (New York '90), American actor and husband of Mariska Hargitay
 Chrissy Houlahan (Philadelphia), United States House Representative from Pennsylvania
 Kevin Huffman (Houston '92), Tennessee State Education Commissioner from April 2011 to January 2015
 Mike Johnston (Mississippi Delta '97), Colorado state senator
 Jason Kamras (Washington, D.C. '96), 2005 National Teacher of the Year
 Kevin Kiley (Los Angeles), United States House Representative from California
 Ezra Koenig, Lead singer of indie rock band Vampire Weekend
 Mark D. Levine (New York City '91), New York City Councilmember
 DeRay Mckesson (New York City '07), Black Lives Matter Movement activist and candidate in the 2016 Baltimore mayoral election
 Tim Morehouse (New York '00), Silver Medal winner in the men's saber as a member of the United States fencing team at the 2008 Summer Olympics
 Brittany Packnett (New York City '07), Black Lives Matter Movement activist and co-founder of Campaign Zero
 Michelle Rhee (Baltimore '92), Former Chancellor of District of Columbia Public Schools and founder of The New Teacher Project and StudentsFirst
 Alec Ross (Baltimore '94), Senior Adviser for Innovation for Secretary of State Hillary Clinton
 Sohrab Ahmari, Iranian-born American journalist
 Tony Vargas (New York '07), Nebraska State Senator, 2018 Presidential Leadership Scholars, and 2017 Ten Outstanding Young Americans
 Zeke Vanderhoek (New York City '98), Founder and Chairman, Manhattan GMAT; Founder and Principal, The Equity Project
 John C. White (2010), Louisiana state superintendent of education since 2012
 Clint Smith (2011), Author and New Yorker Contributor

Organizational growth
Teach For America has witnessed sustained growth over the course of the past two decades. The chart below reflects this growth by highlighting the changes in various performance indicators.

°FY 2013 was a shortened fiscal year as Teach For America shifted to a fiscal year based on the school year. FY 2013 began January 10, 2012, and ended May 31, 2013. Beginning in FY 2014, the fiscal year began June 1 and concluded May 31 of the following year

Acceptance rate
In 2013, the organization received its largest applicant pool to date, with 57,000 people applying to the program. The organization selected approximately 6,000 of the applicants, making its acceptance rate less than 11 percent, the most selective corps in its history. Between 2008 and 2013, acceptance rates hovered around 11-15 percent.

Between 2014 and 2015, the organization maintained a 15 percent acceptance rate despite dropping application numbers.

Receipt of philanthropic funds
Teach for America lists many of its significant contributors on its website. The list includes foundations, individuals, corporations, and public and investor categories.

Among the biggest donors to the organization are the Walton Family Foundation, which has donated to TFA since 1993. In November 2015 the Walton Family Foundation announced a gift to TFA of $50 million over three years to support recruitment efforts and professional development for 4,000 new teachers across the country.

Arthur and Toni Rembe Rock are listed as Champion Donors on the organization's website, having donated more than $5 million. The organization's annual Social Innovation Award is named in their honor. The Arthur & Toni Rembe Rock Social Innovation Award is open to current TFA corps members and alumni. Winners receive $100,000 to build education-focused social ventures.

In 2011, the Eli and Edythe Broad Foundation was the first philanthropic organization to commit to the endowment fund with a pledge of $25 million and called upon other funders to match this figure. Three additional philanthropic donors—the Laura and John Arnold Foundation, the Robertson Foundation, and Steve Mandel—stepped up and each provided $25 million in matching funds.

See also

References

External links
 Teach For America

1990 establishments in the United States
AmeriCorps organizations
Educational organizations based in the United States
Non-profit organizations based in New York City
Service year programs in the United States